Ioan Almășan (born 22 June 1962) is a Romanian former football goalkeeper and manager. He played for Politehnica Timișoara in the 1992 Cupa României final which was won by Steaua București.

Honours
Politehnica Timișoara
 Divizia B: 1988–89, 1994–95
 Cupa României: Runner-up 1991–92
UM Timişoara
 Divizia C: 1998–99

Notes

References

Living people
Romanian footballers
Association football goalkeepers
1962 births
Liga I players
Liga II players
FC Politehnica Timișoara players
CS Unirea Sânnicolau Mare players
Romanian football managers
People from Timiș County